Gresser is a surname of German origin. Notable people with the surname include:

Gisela Kahn Gresser (1906–2000), American chess player
Ignatz Gresser (1835-1919), American soldier
Lawrence Gresser (1851–1935), German-born American politician

See also
Cohen & Gresser

References

Surnames of German origin